Veronica Turleigh (14 January 1903 – 3 September 1971) was an Irish actress.

Biography
Bridget Veronica Turleigh was born on 14 January 1903 at Castleforward Demesne, County Donegal, Ireland. She attended the Catholic University in Dublin. Turleigh was the daughter of a member of the Royal Irish Constabulary, Martin Turley. She married James Laver, an expert on fashion and writer, in 1928. Laver and Turleigh had two children, Patrick and Bridget. Patrick Laver went on to become a British diplomat.

She was a member of the Oxford Playhouse in the 1920s. Turleigh acted alongside and was close friends with actors such as Alec Guinness and Robert Coote. She was proclaimed by Guinness as "one of the six nicest women I know."  In 1939 she played Gertrude in Tyrone Guthrie's modern-dress and uncut Hamlet at The Old Vic with Alec Guinness in the title role.  She appeared in the television series The Saint ("The Good Medicine", 1964) in a supporting role. Her final acting role on the screen was in The Root of All Evil? (1969).

Turleigh died on 3 September 1971, following a fall into a scalding bath at the couple's home, The Glebe, Blackheath, London. Guinness read at her funeral. As her husband was involved in the collection of items related in theatre history and production, items associated with Turleigh's acting career are in the collections of the Victoria and Albert Museum.

Partial filmography and playography
The Innocent Ceremony (1969)
Floating Man (1969)
Guests of Honour (1965)
The Madras House (1965)
Women in Crisis My Grandmother (1964)
The Horse's Mouth (1958)
The Card (1952)
Teresa of Avila
The Agamemnon of Aeschylus

References

External links
The Tablet Obituary
Additional acting roles
Roles with the BBC
Entry on IMDB

1903 births
1971 deaths
20th-century Irish actresses
Accidental deaths in London
Actresses from County Donegal
Irish film actresses
Irish stage actresses
Irish television actresses